Noel Lucas (13 December 1926 – 4 July 2009) was a Barbadian cricketer. He played in three first-class matches for the Barbados cricket team in 1953/54 and 1954/55.

See also
 List of Barbadian representative cricketers

References

External links
 

1926 births
2009 deaths
Barbadian cricketers
Barbados cricketers
People from Saint Michael, Barbados